The 1996–97 Israeli Noar Leumit League was the 47th season of youth football league in Israel and 3rd season of the Noar Leumit League since its introduction in 1994, as the top-tier football in Israel for teenagers between the ages 18–20.

Maccabi Tel Aviv won the title, whilst Maccabi Ahi Nazareth and Hapoel Hadera were relegated.

Final table

External links
IFA 

Israeli Noar Premier League seasons
Youth